Portieria is a red algae genus in the family Rhizophyllidaceae.

References

External links
Portieria at AlgaeBase

Red algae genera
Rhizophyllidaceae